The 2013 Vuelta a Asturias was the 57th edition of the Vuelta a Asturias road cycling stage race, which was held on 11 and 12 May 2013. The race started in Oviedo and finished at Alto del Naranco. The race was won by Amets Txurruka of the  team.

General classification

References

Vuelta Asturias
2013 in road cycling
2013 in Spanish sport